South Korean singer-songwriter IU (Lee Ji-eun) has written over seventy songs, mostly for her own musical career, but also for other performers and for several soundtrack albums. She debuted in September 2008 with the single "Lost Child" and subsequently released the extended play (EP) Lost and Found. The EP was completely written by	Choi Gap-won.

The first song credited to IU was "Alone in the Room", a song from her third extended play, Real, released in 2010. With the release of her second studio album, Last Fantasy (2011), she started to take more creative control over the music, writing six of the thirteen total tracks. The following studio album, Modern Times (2013), and its rerelease, Modern Times – Epilogue (2013), were also mostly written by IU and South Korean lyricist Kim Eana, who previously wrote multiple tracks on Last Fantasy. Her subsequent releases, Chat-Shire (2015) and Palette (2017), were nearly written all by herself, with help from multiple feature artists, including Zion.T, G-Dragon and Oh Hyuk. Her fifth extended play, Love Poem, was entirely written by her, with two tracks—	"The Visitor" and "Blueming", being produced by her. IU wrote and performed multiple songs for various South Korean films and television series, including The Producers, My Mister, Bel Ami and Hotel Del Luna. 

IU has received several accolades for her songwriting, including the Lyricist of the Year award at the 2018 Gaon Chart Music Awards. Sixteen of the tracks written by the singer have been released as singles, with eleven of those reaching the top of the Gaon Digital Chart, including "Through the Night", the fourth best-selling singles in South Korea with more than five million sales.

Songs

References 

IU
Songs written by IU